Kareem Mortimer (born October 17, 1980, in Nassau, Bahamas) is a Bahamian filmmaker who is known for such films as Chance (2005), The Eleutheran Adventure (2006), Float (2007), I Am Not A Dummy (2009), Children of God (2010), Wind Jammers (2010) and Passage (2013). 

His debut feature, Children of God (2010), is the first narrative feature from the Caribbean with LGBT themes. Another project, Wind Jammers (2010), which he co-directed with Richard von Maur, is a children's film that deals with racism.  Children of God was shown on the television channel Showtime as well as distributed in over twenty-four countries around the world. In 2014, Passage was awarded an African Movie Academy Award for Best Short Film from the Diaspora.

References

External links
 Official Website

 Miami New times

1980 births
Living people
People from Nassau, Bahamas
Bahamian film directors